Kologhona is a small town on the southern side of Guadalcanal, Solomon Islands, to the north of Mbolonda Bay. The Itina River flows nearby and it is served by Mbambanakira Airport.

References

Populated places in Guadalcanal Province